In Austria, academic grades use a 5-point grading scale with no decimals, where:

Details of the Austrian system
The Austrian grading system offers a range of five different grades (1 to 5), with 1 (Sehr gut) being the highest and 5 (Nicht genügend) the lowest grade. Students must be evaluated according to objective standards and need to earn at least a grade of 4 (Genügend) in order to pass a course.  

Usually, the top 10% of successful students in class earn a 1 (Sehr gut). However, all passing grades (1 to 4) permit for further studies at university. 

The GPA is commonly used to measure academic success and has become increasingly important for application purposes. Nowadays, most employers ask for your last school certificate when applying for an apprenticeship. The Austrian system is similar to the German system.

References

Austria
Grading
Grading